Neugersdorf is a town in the district Görlitz, in the Free State of Saxony, Germany. It is situated on the border with the Czech Republic, 4 km south of Ebersbach, and 17 km northwest of Zittau.

Since 1 January 2011, it has been a part of the Ebersbach-Neugersdorf municipality for administrative purposes. It has many wooded areas and country trails.

Notable residents
 Margot Dreschel (1908–1945), Nazi concentration camp guard executed for war crimes

References 

Towns in Görlitz (district)
Ebersbach-Neugersdorf
Former municipalities in Saxony